This is a list of the Canada men's national soccer team's unofficial results from their inception to the present day that are not accorded the status of official internationals, not being recognized by FIFA. Player appearances and goals in these matches are also not counted to their totals.

Exhibition (unofficial) matches

1885

1886

1888

1921

1924

1937

1956

1960

1967

1972

1973

1974

1975

1976

1977

1980

1981

1983

1984

1985

1986

1988

1990

1991

2004

2005

2008

2014

2019

References

Unofficial
Lists of national association football team unofficial results
Soccer in Canada